INTRoVOYS is a Filipino pop rock band formed in 1986 by 3rd-G Cristobal, Paco Arespacochaga and Jonathan Buencamino. The band is now based in Los Angeles, California.

History

Formation and early years: 1986-1988
INTRoVOYS was formed in Manila, Philippines  in 1986 by 3rd-G Cristobal, Paco Arespacochaga, Jonathan Buencamino. 3rd-G and Paco were classmates in high school, but have known each other since elementary. The first incarnation of INTRoVOYS had Jonathan Buencamino, Paco Arespacochaga and 3rd-G Cristobal in a small rehearsal space on the corner of Katipunan and Santolan in Quezon City, Philippines. During their first rehearsal, 3rd-G taught Paco how to play the drums. Later, they added Jonathan Buencamino's younger brother Jj to play keyboards, Ira Cruz, lead guitars, and Jobert Buencamino for bass guitar.  They recorded the song Just a Dream which was released in  the 10 of Another Kind compilation album in 1989.

Back to the Roots: 1989-1991
Due to other priorities, 3rd-G had to give up his position as the band’s rhythm guitar player. The band released their debut album, Back to the Roots in 1990. Their first two singles received a lukewarm response and the band's label, Dyna Records, was ready to drop them. In spite of this, their third single However Which Way, went to No. 1 in Metro Manila in just two weeks. It became the No. 1 song in the country after a month, paving the way for a national tour. Culled from the same album are certified No. 1 singles such as, Calling All Nations, Maynila and Lullabye among many others.. Ira Cruz left the band in 1991.

Breaking New Grounds and Line To Heaven: 1991-1994
When Cruz left INTRoVOYS, Vic Carpio replaced him as their new guitarist. The band's second album, Breaking New Grounds, was released in 1992. Included in this album were the hits Will I Survive, Di Na Ako Aasa Pa, Stay and Are You Happy. The album achieved quadruple platinum status, earning INTRoVOYS the tag "The No. 1 Band in the Land".. In 1993, the band released their third album, Line to Heaven, wherein the carrier single was written after Arespacochaga suffered the tragic loss of his parents.  This album also included another hit song, "Kailanman".

Greatest Hits...Live, One and Eroplano: 1994-1999
Jobert Buencamino left the band in 1994 for health and personal reasons. The band invited Paku Herrera of Neocolours to take on Jobert’s chores. They released their first greatest hits concert Greatest Hits...Live followed by their carrier single Living My Life in 1995. The band's fourth album One released in 1996, included hits Tell Me Why, More Than A Friend and Magkaisa Tayong Lahat. This was Arespacochaga's last album and he left the band in 1996 and was replaced by Toto Villanueva as the new drummer. They released their fifth album Eroplano features the hits "Fool", "My Child", "Eroplano", "The Big Ride" and a cover of Mr. Rey Valera's hit Kung Kailangan Mo Ako. A year later, Jonathan Buencamino was forced to leave due to an illness that caused him to lose his voice indefinitely.

Short-Lived Reunion and Hiatus: 2000-2004
In 2000, Paco Arespacochaga went solo and released his album called Rebirth,  featuring three popular songs of his former band and a collaboration with his former wife Geneva Cruz. Paco Arespacochaga rejoined the band in 2000. Ira Cruz, who had played with INTRoVOYS from 1988 to 1991, rejoined with the original line-up members.  Paco, Jonathan, Jj & Jobert Buencamino and Vic Carpio for the short-lived reunion run in 2001 and after that, he decided to pursue other interests. He joined Passage and Co-founded the Band Kapatid. Vic Carpio and Jobert Buencamino decided to retire and pursue other interests and the other members decided to go on an indefinite hiatus.

A Brighter Day and New Beginnings: 2005-2013
After years of hiatus, Arespacochaga, Jonathan & Jj Buencamino decided to get back together and work on a new album with their two new members, Henry Abesamis on bass guitar and Jonathan Manuel on guitars. In 2005, they released a single "Desire" which can be downloaded from their mailing list. and the band released their album entitled A Brighter Day, marks a beginning of a new chapter for the band. The landmark album, released 7 years after their last album, Eroplano, marks the exodus of the band from the Philippines to the United States. 

In December 2006, the band released their first studio Greatest Hits album entitled, New Beginnings, a collection of re-arranged 18 major hits and introduced two new members, Steve Guadiz on guitar and Chot Ulep on bass.

In April 2009, Tim De Ramos joined the band as the new drummer while Arespacochaga assumed duties as the new lead guitarist, Steve Guadiz left INTRoVOYS followed by Chot Ulep.  In September of that same year, G3 Misa, formerly with Shanghaied and Mystery became the new guitarist and Gary Padre became the new bassist.

In October 2011, at the Tanduay Rockfest, Arespachochaga performed signature INTRoVOYS hits including Line To Heaven and Di Na Ako Aasa Pa. Buoyed by the warm welcome he got from the crowd, he stated, "Salamat. Maraming, maraming salamat. By next year, kasama ko na ang buong banda" ("Thank you. Thank you very much. By next year, the rest of the band will be with me.") In June 2012, Jonathan Dela Paz became the new bassist for the band. In May 2013, Jj Buencamino decided to retire and Art Pangilinan became their new keyboardist.

New Single and Where We Left Off: 2014-present
In July 2014, INTRoVOYS released their single "Nasaan Ka" and launched a music video filmed in Los Angeles, CA. In August 2014, the band was featured on Tunay Na Buhay on GMA 7. In September 2014, INTRoVOYS performed in "Mga Bokalista ng Dekadang Nubenta" US Tour along  Jett Pangan, Gary Ignacio, Cooky Chua, and Wency Cornejo. 

In May 2015, keyboardist Art Pangilinan left INTRoVOYS, they continue touring as a four piece. In the end of 2015, Jj Buencamino – INTRoVOYS’ original keyboard player re-joined the band. In January 2016, INTRoVOYS released their latest album, "Where We Left Off". It is currently available for download on their website, www.introvoys.com/store. This year, G3 Misa left and INTRoVOYS’ guitar player Vic Carpio returns. In May 2018, bassist JD dela Paz announced his hiatus with the band.

INTRoVOYS line-ups

Discography

Studio albums
Back to the Roots (Dyna Music, 1990)
Breaking New Grounds (MCA Music Philippines, 1992)
Line to Heaven (MCA Music Philippines, 1993)
One (MCA Music Philippines, 1996)
Eroplano (MCA Music Philippines, 1997)
A Brighter Day (MCA Music Philippines, 2005)
Where We Left Off (BMAD Media, 2016)

Live albums
Greatest Hits...Live (PolyEast Records, 1994)

Compilation albums
New Beginnings: The Greatest Hits Collection (2heaven Muzik, 2007)

Singles
"Just a Dream"
"However Which Way"
"Kaibigan"
"Calling All Nations"
"Maynila"
"Lullabye"
"Will I Survive"
"'Di Na Ko Aasa Pa" (now covered by Sabrina Orial)
"Binibini"
"Are You Happy"
"Line to Heaven" (1993)
"Kailanman"
"My Girl"
"Kapayapaan"
"Tell Me Why"
"More Than a Friend"
"Magkaisa Tayong Lahat"
"Living My Life"
"In a Little While"
"Desire"
"Nasaan Ka" (2013)

References

External links
Official Website www.introvoys.com

Sources

INTRoVOYS
Musical groups from Metro Manila
Musical groups established in 1986